Douglas Tynwald Kelly (July 21, 1920 – January 10, 2006) was a Canadian politician. He served in the Legislative Assembly of British Columbia from 1972 to 1975, as a NDP member for the constituency of Omineca.

References

British Columbia New Democratic Party MLAs
1920 births
2006 deaths